Great Northern 2584 is a 4-8-4 "Northern" type steam locomotive built by the Baldwin Locomotive Works in Philadelphia, Pennsylvania in March 1930 for the Great Northern Railway (GN) as a member of the S-2 class.

The locomotive was built for fast passenger service and was assigned to pull the Great Northern's mainline passenger trains such as the Empire Builder and Oriental Limited. It was then retired in December 1957 and put on display at the Havre station in Havre, Montana for display in May 1964. It is the sole surviving Great Northern S-2 Class "Northern", the sole surviving Great Northern "Northern" type and the largest surviving Great Northern steam locomotive.

Service history
When delivered to the Great Northern in April 1930, 2584 was assigned to the railroad's premier passenger trains such as the Empire Builder and Oriental Limited between St. Paul, Minnesota and Seattle, Washington as well as fast mail trains. Initially, the locomotive was assigned to the flatter districts due to the districts having long tangents, easy curves and light grades, then a test in 1931 proved the class was capable of pulling the Empire Builder over the Divide between Havre and Whitefish, Montana where grades are up to 1.8% and the locomotive was also assigned to the Divide and eventually as far east as St. Paul, Minnesota, where the Empire Builder starts on the Great Northern's mainline. In 1945, the locomotive was fitted with Timken roller bearings on every axle, including every axle on its tender, replacing its original plain bearings. By 1949, despite performing excellently in passenger service, the railroad had dieselised its premier passenger trains and the locomotive was then reassigned to secondary passenger trains and freight service, of which the latter service was proven to be rather unsuitable for it due to being designed as a passenger locomotive. By the 1950s, No. 2584 and her sister locomotives were repainted from their original Glacier Green to black. 

In late 1956, 2584 made its final run and was stored in a roundhouse in Superior, Wisconsin and had its axle boxes painted red and sat there for years.

Accident
On August 9, 1945, No. 2584 was involved in a wreck, however, the locomotive was undamaged, as the rear of its train was rear-ended by sister locomotive No. 2588 at 45 mph. No. 2584's tender, however, had suffered from a hot box and has stopped at Petersburg, North Dakota and again at Michigan, North Dakota prior to the wreck. After the hot box and accident were resolved, both 2584 and 2588 were returned to service.

Preservation
2584 was retired in December 1957 and on March 21, 1958, the Great Northern had decided to hold it for historical purposes and it was eventually repainted to its original Glacier Green paint scheme and today is owned by Great Northern's eventual successor, Burlington Northern Santa Fe. On May 15, 1964, the locomotive was put on display at the Havre depot in Havre, Montana and was dedicated there. As of today, it still resides there on display. It also has a marker describing the locomotive and the S-2 class in general on the engineer's side of the locomotive's tender.

References

Great Northern Railway (U.S.)
4-8-4 locomotives
Baldwin locomotives
Passenger locomotives
Railway locomotives introduced in 1930
2584
Individual locomotives of the United States
Standard gauge locomotives of the United States
Steam locomotives of the United States
Preserved steam locomotives of Montana